Wreck or The Wreck may refer to:

Common uses
 Wreck, a collision of an automobile, aircraft or other vehicle
 Shipwreck, the remains of a ship after a crisis at sea

Places
 The Wreck (surf spot), a surf spot at Byron Bay, New South Wales, Australia

Arts, entertainment, and media

Films
 The Wreck (1913 film), an Australian film
 The Wreck (1927 film), an American film

Music
 The Wrecks, an American alternative rock band
 Wreck (band), an American indie rock band
 Wreck (album), a 2012 album by Unsane
 "Wreck", a song by Gentle Giant from their album Acquiring the Taste

Television
 Wreck (TV series), British six-part comedy horror television series

Other uses in arts, entertainment, and media
 Wrecks, one-man play by Neil LaBute
The Wreck, story by Guy de Maupassant

Other uses
 Wreck, a ceremony of initiation into the 40 et 8 club

See also
 Emergency wreck buoy, a navigation mark warning of a new wreck.
 Rambling Wreck, a car that leads the Georgia Tech football team onto the field prior to every game in Bobby Dodd Stadium
 Receiver of Wreck, an official of the British government whose main task is to process incoming reports of wreck
 Reck (disambiguation)
 "Wreck Of The Hesperus"
 Wreck of the Hesperus (band)
 "Wreck of the Hesperus" (song)
 Wreck-It Ralph
 Wreck-It Ralph 2 also known as Ralph Breaks the Internet
 Wreckage (disambiguation)
 WREK (FM), a radio station at Georgia Tech, named after the car